Soltanabad (also Romanized as Solţānābād) is a village in Kalkharan Rural District of the Central District of Ardabil County, Ardabil province, Iran. At the 2006 census, its population was 1,752 in 368 households. The following census in 2011 counted 1,857 people in 452 households. The latest census in 2016 showed a population of 1,830 people in 528 households; it is the largest village in its rural district.

References 

Ardabil County

Towns and villages in Ardabil County

Populated places in Ardabil Province

Populated places in Ardabil County